is a passenger railway station in located in the city of Suzuka, Mie Prefecture, Japan, operated by Central Japan Railway Company (JR Tōkai).

Lines
Kawano Station is served by the Kansai Main Line, and is 47.5 rail kilometers from the terminus of the line at Nagoya Station.

Station layout
The station consists of two opposed side platforms, connected by a level crossing.

Platform

Adjacent stations

|-
!colspan=5|Central Japan Railway Company (JR Central)

Station history
The JGR became the Japan National Railways (JNR) after World War II. The station was named  at the time, but was renamed to its present name on July 10, 1973. The station has been unattended since February, 1986. The station was absorbed into the JR Central network upon the privatization of the JNR on April 1, 1987.

Station numbering was introduced to the section of the Kansai Main Line operated JR Central in March 2018; Kawano Station was assigned station number CI14.

Passenger statistics
In fiscal 2019, the station was used by an average of 322 passengers daily (boarding passengers only).

Surrounding area
Suzuka City Kobe Junior High School
Suzuka City Kawano Elementary Schoo

See also
 List of railway stations in Japan

References

External links

Railway stations in Japan opened in 1949
Railway stations in Mie Prefecture
Suzuka, Mie